Melanochromis loriae is a species of cichlid in the Cichlidae endemic to Lake Malawi. This species can reach a length of  TL.

Once believed to only occur around Chipoka Island, a revision in 2012 synonymized M. loriae with the parallel striped mbuna, M. parallelus, which has populations around Likoma Island, Chisumulu Island, and the northwestern coast.

Collection of specimens for the aquarium trade is a threat to its wild populations.

The specific name honours the daughter of the fish dealer John Lomardo, Lori.

References

loriae
Fish of Lake Malawi
Fish of Malawi
Fish of Mozambique
Freshwater fish of Tanzania
Fish described in 1975
Taxa named by Donald S. Johnson
Taxonomy articles created by Polbot